Älta is a locality situated in Nacka Municipality, Stockholm County, Sweden with 14,103 inhabitants in 2019.

Sports
The following sports clubs are located in Älta:

 Älta IF

References 

Populated places in Nacka Municipality